Ruckersville is an unincorporated community in Elbert County, Georgia.

History
Ruckersville was founded in the 1773, and named after Ruckersville, Virginia. The pioneering Rucker family maintained the Rucker House at the site, which still stands today.

A post office called Ruckersville was established in 1823, and remained in operation until 1901. The Georgia General Assembly incorporated Ruckersville as a town in 1822. The town's municipal charter was repealed in 1995.

Joseph Rucker Lamar (1857–1916), an associate justice of the Supreme Court of the United States, was born in Ruckersville.

References

Former municipalities in Georgia (U.S. state)
Unincorporated communities in Elbert County, Georgia
Unincorporated communities in Georgia (U.S. state)
Populated places disestablished in 1995
Populated places established in 1823
1823 establishments in Georgia (U.S. state)
1995 disestablishments in Georgia (U.S. state)